Lehal is a village in Jalandhar district of Punjab State, India. It is located 7.3 km away from postal head office in Dosanjh Kalan, 23.9 km from Phillaur, 37.8 km from district headquarter Jalandhar and 121 km from state capital Chandigarh. The village is administrated by a sarpanch who is an elected representative of village as per Panchayati raj (India).

Demography 
According to the report published by Census India in 2011 , Lehal has a total number of 230 houses and population of 1114 of which include 559 males and 555 females. Literacy rate of Lehal is 83.45%, higher than state average of 75.84%. The population of children under the age of 6 years is 105 which is 9.43% of total population of Lehal, and child sex ratio is approximately 810 lower than state average of 846.

Most of the people are from Schedule Caste which constitutes 54.31% of total population in Lehal. The town does not have any Schedule Tribe population so far.

As per census 2011, 380 people were engaged in work activities out of the total population of Lehal which includes 317 males and 63 females. According to census survey report 2011, 88.95% workers describe their work as main work and 11.5% workers are involved in marginal activity providing livelihood for less than 6 months.

Transport 
Goraya railway station is the nearest train station however, Phagwara Junction train station is 15.8 km away from the village. The village is 54.6 km away from domestic airport in Ludhiana and the nearest international airport is located in Chandigarh also Sri Guru Ram Dass Jee International Airport is the second nearest airport which is 132 km away in Amritsar.

References 

Villages in Jalandhar district